Tormod Hermansen (born 23 April 1940) is a former CEO of Telenor and State Secretary of Finansdepartementet (1978–1979).

His brother is Robert Hermansen.

References

Norwegian chief executives
Norwegian state secretaries
1940 births
Living people